Shah Nyalchand  (14 September 1915 – 3 January 1997) was an Indian Test cricketer.

Nyalchand was a left arm medium pace bowler who was particularly effective on matting wickets. His only Test match was against Pakistan at Lucknow in 1952/53, which was one of only two occasions that a matting wicket was used for a Test in India. He returned figures of 3 for 97. Frank Worrell once described Nyalchand as the 'king of matting wickets'.

Nyalchand played 24 seasons of Ranji Trophy, half of which were for Saurashtra. He captained Saurashtra for three seasons. His most successful season was 1961/62 when he took 27 wickets, including a split hat-trick against Maharashtra. During this purple patch, he took ten wickets in three consecutive matches across two seasons. Apart from the Test, he appeared for a few times for zonal sides against visiting teams. He toured East Africa with the Sundar Cricket Club of Bombay in 1957.

Nyalchand was schooled in Sir Ajitsinhji High School in Dhrangadhra. He worked as a draughtsman with the Public Works Department of Gujarat government at Rajkot. He did cricket coaching for a time and was the recipient of an aid from the benefit fund of BCCI. His death was from a massive heart attack.

References

 Obituary in Indian Cricket 1998

External links

1910s births
1997 deaths
India Test cricketers
Indian cricketers
Saurashtra cricketers
Western India cricketers
West Zone cricketers
Gujarat cricketers
People from Surendranagar district
Cricketers from Gujarat